The 2015–16 season was be Al Shorta's 42nd season in the Iraqi Premier League, having featured in all 42 editions of the competition. Al Shorta participated in the Iraqi Premier League and withdrew from the Iraq FA Cup.

They entered this season having finished in third place in the league in the 2014–15 season, but this season they only managed to finish in seventh place in the league after failing to win any of their last six games. The managerial instability at the club contributed to their disappointing campaign as they had four different managers all in the same season.

Squad

Departed during season

Personnel

Technical Staff

Management

Kit

Transfers

In

Out

Competitions

Iraqi Premier League

Group stage (group 2)

Results by matchday

Elite Stage

Results by matchday

Other sports

References

External links
Al Shorta website
Al Shorta TV
Team info at goalzz.com

Al-Shorta SC seasons
Al Shorta